Peter Norman Stuart Stephens (19 December 1927 – 27 August 2016) was a British journalist and newspaper editor.

Stephens grew up in Nottingham, where he attended the Mundella Grammar School.  He became a journalist at the end of World War II, working successively at the Newark Advertiser, the Northern Echo, the Daily Dispatch and the Daily Mirror, then in 1957 becoming assistant editor of the Newcastle Journal.  In 1962, he moved to become assistant editor of the Evening Chronicle, being made editor in 1962, then editor of the Newcastle Journal in 1966.  In 1970, he moved to London to become assistant editor of The Sun, briefly serving as deputy editor before moving to the News of the World in 1973, where he was associate editor for a year, then editor from 1974 to 1975.  He then finished his career as associate editor of The Sun until 1981.

In retirement, Stephens wrote several books on the history of Newark, Nottinghamshire, and an autobiography, P. S. on a life in newspapers.

References

1927 births
2016 deaths
British male journalists
British newspaper editors
News of the World people
Writers from Nottingham